Star of Mysore is an Indian English language evening daily newspaper published in Mysore, India. This newspaper was launched in 1978. Its founder, editor and publisher is entrepreneur and writer K B Ganapathy.

Controversy 
On April 6, 2020, an article titled "Bad apples in the basket" written by the editors K B Ganapathy and M Govinde Gowda was published. The article read "The presence of bad apples cannot be wished away. They are there in whatever way one wants to identify them, doesn’t matter if it is religious, political or social, taking care not to generalise. An ideal solution to the problem created by bad apples is to get rid of them, as the former leader of Singapore did a few decades ago or as the leadership in Israel is currently doing."

It was interpreted that the editors are referring to the people of the Muslim community and calling for a genocide. The article was widely opposed and provoked outrage. The editorial issued an apology stating that the article was mainly focused on the spread of Covid-19.

See also 
 Mysooru Mithra
 List of Kannada-language newspapers
 List of Kannada-language magazines
 List of newspapers in India
 Media in Karnataka
 Media of India

References

External links 
 
 Official site: Epaper Star of Mysore 

English-language newspapers published in India
Newspapers published in Mysore
Publications established in 1978
1978 establishments in Karnataka